The following lists events that happened during 2015 in Ukraine.

Events

January
 January 3 - An image of a BPM-97 apparently inside Ukraine, in Luhansk, appeared to deliver further evidence of Russian military vehicles inside Ukraine.
 January 6 - A military truck collides with a bus carrying members of the National Guard of Ukraine killing 12 soldiers and injuring 20 others.
 January 13 - A passenger bus is fired upon by rebels at a check point in eastern Ukraine. At least ten civilians were killed and many others injured.
 January 22 - An explosion on a civilian bus in the city of Donetsk kills thirteen people. Separatists and pro-government forces blame each other for the incident.
 January 24 - An attack on an open-air market in Mariupol, Ukraine leaves at least 27 people killed and more than 90 injured.  The pro-Russian rebel leader, Alexander Zakharchenko, announces an offensive on Mariupol.

February 
 February 7 - The leaders of France, Germany and Russia agree to work on a peace plan to be put to the President of Ukraine Petro Poroshenko on February 8.
 February 9 - An artillery shell causes a massive explosion at a chemical plant in Donetsk.
 February 10 - Fighting kills fifteen people and leaves 60 injured as missiles hit Ukraine's military headquarters in the city of Kramatorsk.
 February 13 - Ahead of the February 15 start of the agreed ceasefire, fighting in the past 24 hours kills eight Armed Forces of Ukraine service personnel.
 February 14 - Ukrainian President Petro Poroshenko warns of a threat to a planned ceasefire tonight from heavy fighting today and accuses Russia of "significantly increasing" its offensive. In a live interview he ordered all Ukrainian forces to cease fire after midnight.
 February 16
 During the ceasefire, fighting kills at least five Ukrainian Army soldiers with 22 injured.
 The Minister of Foreign Affairs of Ukraine Pavlo Klimkin claims that pro-Russian forces have fired on Ukrainian forces over 100 times in the past day. Separatists accuse Ukrainian troops of having violated the ceasefire.
February 17 - The office of the President of Ukraine calls on the European Union and NATO to condemn the Russian backed rebels after the rebels conquered most of the town of Debaltseve and encircled 10,000 Ukrainian troops in the area. Rebel government officials claimed the town was not part of the recently established ceasefire.
February 21 - Currency value temporarily falls in face of military threats.

March 
 March 4 - At least 17 miners die in a suspected gas explosion at the Zasyadko coal mine in rebel-held eastern Ukraine.

April

May

June

July

August

Deaths
May 23 - Aleksey Mozgovoy, rebel commander (assassinated)

References

 
2010s in Ukraine
Years of the 21st century in Ukraine
Ukraine
Ukraine